Harold Leaon Weafer (March 27, 1900 – August 23, 1978) was an American professional baseball player and umpire. Weafer was a first baseman in minor league baseball. He became an American League umpire in 1943 and stayed there until 1947. He umpired 776 major league games.

Career
Weafer traveled around the minor leagues for over a decade.

He retired as a player after 1933 and became a minor league umpire. He worked in the Bi-State League in 1935, the International League from 1936 to 1937, and the American Association from 1938 to 1942. After the president of the American Association suggested that Weafer lose 15–20 pounds for a promotion to MLB umpiring, he began dieting and chopping down Christmas trees. He slimmed down from 220 pounds to 170 pounds. He received his major league opportunity in September 1942. He remained an AL umpire until 1947. After his MLB umpiring days, Weafer served as an umpire supervisor in the minor leagues. He approved and worked with graduates of the Al Somers Umpire School.

Personal life
Weafer attended Burdett College in Massachusetts. His brother Ken Weafer played in one game for the Boston Bees in 1936.

See also
List of Major League Baseball umpires

References

External links

 Career statistics and umpire information from Retrosheet

1900 births
1978 deaths
Baseball people from Massachusetts
Major League Baseball umpires
Sportspeople from Middlesex County, Massachusetts
Reading Coal Barons players
Lewiston Red Sox players
Petersburg Goobers players
St. Joseph Saints players
New Haven Weissmen players
Worcester Boosters players
Richmond Colts players
Wilson Bugs players
Petersburg Trunkmakers players
Wilmington Pirates players
Winston-Salem Twins players
High Point Pointers players
New York Mets scouts
People from Woburn, Massachusetts